Ivan Fundora Zaldivar (born April 14, 1976) is a male freestyle wrestler from Cuba who was an olympian in 2004 and 2008. He won the bronze medal in the Men's freestyle 74kg at the 2004 Summer Olympics. and finished in 5th place in Men's freestyle 74 kg at the 2008 Summer Olympics.

Fundora also wrestled at 5 world championships. He won bronze at the 2007 FILA Wrestling World Championships.

In addition, Fundora also won a gold medal in Wrestling at the 2007 Pan American Games and came in first place each year from 2003-2010 at the Pan American Championships. He is notable among American wrestling fans for defeating Ben Askren at the 2008 Olympics.

References

External links
 Wrestler bio on beijing2008.com

1976 births
Cuban male sport wrestlers
Living people
Wrestlers at the 2004 Summer Olympics
Wrestlers at the 2007 Pan American Games
Wrestlers at the 2008 Summer Olympics
Olympic bronze medalists for Cuba
Olympic wrestlers of Cuba
Olympic medalists in wrestling
Medalists at the 2004 Summer Olympics
World Wrestling Championships medalists
Pan American Games gold medalists for Cuba
Pan American Games medalists in wrestling
Medalists at the 2007 Pan American Games
20th-century Cuban people
21st-century Cuban people